Kids Hope USA is a national, non-profit organization that facilitates mentoring relationships with at-risk children through a church-school partnership. It has nearly 1,000 church-school partnerships in 34 states across the U.S. with over 15,000 mentor-student relationships existing within these partnerships.

History 
Kids Hope USA was founded in 1993. After asking experts in law enforcement, education, religion, and health and human services if churches could address the needs of growing numbers of at-risk children, a unanimous answer was given—churches that mobilize and train their members to form one-to-one relationships with the youngest children can make a profound difference in their lives. Responding to this, in February 1995, Kids Hope USA initiated three pilot sites in Michigan. These programs triggered interest in many other communities, where church and school representatives soon requested program information.

The Kids Hope USA Way 
The Kids Hope USA model was designed to teach churches how to give hope to at-risk public elementary schoolchildren through a relationship with a caring church member. The model relies on the interplay of four integral parts:

--One child: an at-risk public elementary school child who needs a relationship with a caring adult;

--One hour: sixty critical minutes each week when a trained mentor befriends a child and helps him or her acquire basic academic skills;

--One church: a committed congregation who owns the program with its neighborhood school and provides a trained mentor and a behind-the-scenes prayer partner for each child; and

--One school: a school that welcomes this proven intervention to increase the academic skills of at-risk children, at no cost to the school.

Today, Kids Hope USA has helped nearly 1,000 Christian churches in 34 states engage their members in the lives of nearly 15,000 at-risk children. Located in urban, suburban and rural communities, these churches range in size from 40 to 5,000 members and represent over 30 different denominations.

References

External links 
 Official website
 
 Making School-Church Partnerships Work
 Reaching Out

Youth organizations based in Michigan